Alcazar Garden is a garden in San Diego's Balboa Park, in the United States.

References

External links

 
 , The Travel Channel

Balboa Park (San Diego)
Gardens in California